Linda Reid is a Canadian politician. She was Minister of Advanced Education and a Speaker of the Legislative Assembly of British Columbia. She was first elected in 1991 to represent the riding of Richmond East and was re-elected in 1996, 2001, 2005, 2009, 2013. Reid served as Minister of State for Childcare from June 2005 to June 2009 and the Minister of State for Early Childhood Development from June 2001 to June 2005. She also served as the Deputy Speaker from 2009 until 2013.

Early life 
Reid was born in Vancouver, British Columbia in 1959. She attended the University of British Columbia (UBC) where she earned her education degree. She went on to earn a Master of Arts degree from UBC, specializing in education, exceptional learners, language acquisition, and public administration. Prior to her election to the Legislative Assembly, Reid worked as a language therapist, teacher and school administrator for the Richmond School District. Reid is a longtime supporter and member of the Girl Guides of Canada as a child and as an adult; she also helped lead the charge to create a charitable endowment to support Camp Olave, a Guiding camp property on British Columbia's Sunshine Coast.

Politics 
October 17, 2011, marked the 20th anniversary of Reid's election to the Legislative Assembly. She was one of the longest serving MLAs in British Columbia and the only one to have served consecutive terms for over 20 years.

Prior to her appointment as Deputy Speaker, Reid served as Minister of State for Early Childhood Development (2001–2005) and Minister of State for Childcare (2005–2009). As Minister for Early Childhood Development, Reid oversaw the creation of 6,000 new childcare spaces in British Columbia. In 2002, Reid created an individualized funding model for children with autism spectrum disorder which takes into account the individual needs of each child and is provided on a monthly basis. Also in 2002, Reid announced the creation of the BC Early Childhood Development Legacy Fund, which supports community initiatives to support children under the age of 6. As Minister for Childcare, Reid oversaw the Boost BC program in 2007, which distributed free booster seats to low-income families to coincide with the passing of new requirements that children between 20–40 lbs use a booster seat in vehicles.

Reid previously served in a variety of critic roles for the Official Opposition, including children and families, health, attorney general, municipal affairs, and science, technology and research. She was also the Opposition Caucus Chair from 1991 to 1992. Reid has served on Treasury Board, and on the Select Standing Committee to Appoint a Child, Youth and Family Advocate, the Select Standing Committee to Appoint a Police Complaints Commissioner, the Select Standing Committee on Transportation, Municipal Affairs and Housing and the Select Standing Committee on Crown Corporations.

Electoral record

Personal life 
Reid lives in Richmond, British Columbia, with her husband and two children.

Reid supports a variety of causes in her riding and around the province. Reid was a supporter of the Nelson Road Interchange project which was completed in 2011. This new interchange reduces truck traffic and improves safety for farmers and their families. Reid advocated for the creation of an endowment fund for the Girl Guides of Canada to protect against changes in the property tax exemption status on their camp - Camp Olave. In 2008, Reid was instrumental in the implementation of the Roots of Empathy program in BC. This program aims to reduce bullying by fostering empathy. Reid was the 2004–2005 chair of the Canada Northwest Fetal Alcohol Partnership, which aims to develop an inter provincial approach to preventing FASD.

In January 2012, Reid traveled to New Mexico for the opening of their 50th legislative session. Reid's trip to New Mexico stemmed from a friendship agreement between the legislative assemblies of British Columbia and New Mexico. This friendship agreement allows for exchanges of information and traditions between the two.

Reid is an avid supporter of Richmond's agricultural community. She frequents local farms and markets to purchase vegetables and fruits and encourages her constituents to do the same. Reid has advocated for better drainage in Richmond and for the Nelson Road Interchange project, both of which have had positive effects on the agricultural community.

On March 9, 2012, Reid was announced as the winner of the Ethel Tibbits Award in the category of community, in recognition of her two decades of work as a political and community leader. The awards, known as the Ethels, are run by the Richmond Review newspaper.

Reid continues to serve as an honorary co-chair of the Annual Women's Campaign School, which aims to get more women involved in the democratic process. Reid was the BC chair for the Canadian Guide Dogs for the Blind and a director of the Garden City Hospice Society. She has been active in the Richmond Chamber of Commerce, the Asia-Pacific Business Association, and the Canadian Council for Exceptional Children and the Family Court Committee of Richmond. She was a founding member of the Richmond Chinatown Lions Club and was chair of the British Columbia Youth Parliament board from 1986 to 1991. In 2012, the British Columbia Youth Parliament honoured Reid with the first ever award for Outstanding Leadership.

Cabinet positions

References 

1959 births
21st-century Canadian politicians
21st-century Canadian women politicians
Autism activists
British Columbia Liberal Party MLAs
Canadian schoolteachers
Living people
Members of the Executive Council of British Columbia
People from Richmond, British Columbia
Politicians from Vancouver
Speakers of the Legislative Assembly of British Columbia
University of British Columbia Faculty of Education alumni
Women government ministers of Canada
Women legislative speakers
Women MLAs in British Columbia